The North American Soccer League Draft first overall pick was the player who is selected first among all eligible draftees by a team during the annual North American Soccer League (NASL) Draft. The first pick was awarded to the club with the poorest regular season record during the previous NASL campaign. Exceptions were when there was an expansion club, where the expansion side has the opportunity to select the first overall draft pick. 

The draft was held in 1968 and annually from 1972 until 1984.

Key

List of first overall picks

See also 
 List of first overall MLS draft picks

References 

North American Soccer League (1968–1984) lists
First overall NASL draft picks
Association football draft picks